The 1937 Wandsworth Central by-election was held on 29 April 1937.  The by-election was held due to the death of the incumbent Conservative MP, Henry Jackson.  It was won by the Labour candidate Harry Nathan.

References

Wandsworth Central by-election
Wandsworth Central,1937
Wandsworth Central by-election
Wandsworth Central,1937